Atsushi Negishi (born 20 March 1977 in Chichibu) is a Japanese equestrian. At the 2012 Summer Olympics he competed in the Individual eventing.

References

External links
 

Japanese male equestrians
1977 births
Living people
Olympic equestrians of Japan
Equestrians at the 2012 Summer Olympics
Asian Games medalists in equestrian
Equestrians at the 2010 Asian Games
Asian Games gold medalists for Japan
Medalists at the 2010 Asian Games